The 1938 Oklahoma Sooners football team represented the University of Oklahoma in the 1938 college football season. In their second year under head coach Tom Stidham, the Sooners compiled a 10–1 record (5–0 against conference opponents), won the school's first Big Six Conference football championship, and outscored their opponents by a combined total of 185 to 29. The team's only loss came in the 1939 Orange Bowl, losing to Tennessee by a 17 to 0 score.

End Waddy Young (Walter R. Young) received All-America honors in 1938, and six Sooners received all-conference honors: Young, guards Jerry Bolton and Ralph Stevenson, backs Earl Crowder and Hugh McCullough, and tackle Gilford Duggan.

Schedule

NFL Draft
The following players were drafted into the National Football League following the season.

Rankings

The first AP Poll for 1938 came out on October 17. The Sooners were ranked fourteenth in the first poll. They finished the year ranked fourth.

References

Oklahoma
Oklahoma Sooners football seasons
Big Eight Conference football champion seasons
Oklahoma Sooners football